{{Infobox military unit
|unit_name= 3rd Battalion 1st Marines
|image=USMC - 3RD BN-1ST MAR 3.png
|caption=
3rd Battalion 1st Marines Insignia
|dates= 12 March 1956 – October 196016 February 1932 – 20 March 19474 August 1950 – present
|country= 
|allegiance= 
|branch= 
|type= Light infantry
|role= Locate, close with, and destroy the enemy through fire and maneuver, and repel enemy assault through fire and close combat.
|size= 1,200
|command_structure= 1st Marine Regiment1st Marine Division
|current_commander= LtCol Bart P. Lambert
|garrison=Marine Corps Base Camp Pendleton
|ceremonial_chief= SgtMaj Douglas E. Gardner
|colonel_of_the_regiment=
|nickname= "Thundering Third"
|patron=
|motto= The Balls of the Corps
|colors=
|march=
|mascot=
|battles= World War II
Guadalcanal campaign
Battle of Cape Gloucester
Battle of Peleliu
Battle of Okinawa
Korean War
Battle of Inchon
Second Battle of Seoul
Battle of Chosin Reservoir
 Battle of Hwacheon
 Battle of the Punchbowl
 Battle of Bunker Hill (1952)
 First Battle of the Hook
 Battle for Outpost Vegas
 Battle of the Samichon River
Vietnam War
Operation Union
Operation Union II
Operation Badger Tooth
Operation Napoleon/Saline
Operation Swift
Operation Mameluke Thrust
Operation Desert Storm1992 Los Angeles Riots Operation United ShieldWar on TerrorOperation Enduring Freedom
Operation Iraqi Freedom
|notable_commanders=Richard P. Ross Jr.Foster C. LaHueCarl W. Hoffman
|anniversaries=
}}3rd Battalion 1st Marines (3/1) is an infantry battalion in the United States Marine Corps based out of Camp Horno on Marine Corps Base Camp Pendleton, California.  Nicknamed the "Thundering Third", the battalion consists of approximately 1,220 Marines and Sailors and falls under the command of the 1st Marine Regiment and the 1st Marine Division.

Subordinate units and current commanders
 Headquarters and Service Company (Hateful Company)
 Iron Company (Boats)
 Kiote Company (Tracks)
 Lonestar Company (Air Assault)
 Wrangler Company

History

Beginnings

3rd Battalion, 1st Marines was activated on 1 March 1941 at Guantanamo Bay, Cuba and assigned to the 1st Marine Division. In April of that year, they were relocated to Marine Barracks, Parris Island, South Carolina; the unit was subsequently deactivated in October of that year.

World War II
On 16 February 1942, 3/1 was re-activated at New River, North Carolina.  In July 1942, they deployed to Wellington, New Zealand and participated in the following World War II campaigns: Guadalcanal, Eastern New Guinea, New Britain, Peleliu and Okinawa. Beginning in April 1946, they participated in the occupation of North China.  The battalion was again deactivated on 20 March 1947 as part of the post-war drawdown of forces.

Korean War
The start of the Korean War saw the reactivation of 3/1 on 4 August 1950 at Marine Corps Base Camp Pendleton, California and their quick deployment to Korea in September.  The battalion's first action was at the Battle of Inchon in September 1950.  Following the recapture of Seoul, 3/1, along with the rest of the 1st Marine Division, was put back on ship and sailed around to the east coast of Korea.  They eventually landed at Wonsan in late October and from there participated in the Battle of Chosin Reservoir.  During the battle they were the only battalion from the Chesty Puller's 1st Marine Regiment to make it as far north as Hagaru-ri. After the withdrawal from Chosin the 1st Marine Division was evacuated from Hungnam. The battalion took part in fighting on the East Central Front and Western Front of the Jamestown Line for the remainder of the war.  After the Korean Armistice Agreement was signed, they participated in the defense of the Korean Demilitarized Zone from July 1953 to April 1955.  In April 1955, the battalion re-located to MCB Camp Pendleton, California.

From October to December 1962, 3/1 was part of the amphibious task force sent to the Caribbean in response to the Cuban Missile Crisis.

Vietnam War

From January 1966 to May 1971, the battalion fought in the Vietnam War, operating from Chu Lai, Da Nang, Thang Binh, Thanh Thuy, Cửa Việt, Ca Lu, Vandegrift Combat Base, Route 9, An Hoa, and Hoa Vang.  In May 1971, they re-located to MCB Camp Pendleton, California.

Persian Gulf War & the 1990s
The battalion deployed to Saudi Arabia in December 1990 in support of Operation Desert Shield and in March 1991, they transitioned to combat operations during Operation Desert Storm. May 1992 brought the battalion up a short drive Interstate 5 to Los Angeles to aid local police in riot control operations during the 1992 Los Angeles riots.

February and March 1995 saw a deployment to Somalia to support Operation United Shield, helping the remaining UN troops evacuate.  The next major deployment was in October 2000 to support Operation Determined Response.

Global War on Terror

Operation Iraqi Freedom

3rd Battalion, 1st Marines deployed to Kuwait in January 2003. In March of that year the battalion took part in the 2003 invasion of Iraq, including the Battle of Nasiriyah.  The battalion re-deployed to Camp Pendleton in the summer of 2003.

The unit then re-deployed to Iraq in mid-2004, and was based near Fallujah.  They were the main effort in November 2004 during Operation Al Fajr (pronounced Al Fad-jer), the retaking of the city of Fallujah.  Before the assault commenced, the operation was known as Operation Phantom Fury.  3rd Battalion, 1st Marines was part of the composition of RCT 1.  RCT 1 was partly responsible for clearing the infamous Jolan District among others.  Alongside RCT 7, four Marine battalions (including 1/3, 1/8, and 3/5) and various US Army units reclaimed the city of Fallujah from unrest.

The battalion re-deployed back to Iraq in September 2005 and were attached to 2nd Marine Regiment (known as Regimental Combat Team 2), and on 20 February 2006 were attached to the 7th Marine Regiment (known as Regimental Combat Team 7) in western Iraq, carrying out security and stabilization operations.  The Battalion returned to Camp Pendleton at the end of March.

On 10 April 2007, 3/1 deployed as the ground combat element of the 13th Marine Expeditionary Unit.  They were ordered into Iraq as part of Operation Phantom Thunder. Operating north of Fallujah and Karmah in the Tharthar region in AO Anaheim, MARSOC units attached to the MEU were operating for several days before the ground combat element began operating on 15 June 2007. They were to establish a Coalition presence in an area that had only had 14 days of Coalition presence since the invasion in March 2003. 3/1 concluded operations in Iraq after 90 days on 20 September 2007 and soon after re-embarked on the naval strike group and set sail for the United States and returned to Camp Pendleton on 17 November 2007.

3/1 deployed to Okinawa in July 2008 as part of the ground combat element of the 31st Marine Expeditionary Unit.  

Haditha killings

In 2006, Time magazine published an article about an incident that took place on 19 November 2005 in which a group of Marines from 3/1 Kilo Company allegedly killed 24 unarmed Iraqi civilians in the city of Haditha as retribution for an IED attack that killed Lance Corporal Miguel Terrazas.

An initial Marine Corps communique reported that 15 civilians were killed by the bomb's blast and eight insurgents were subsequently killed when the Marines returned fire against those attacking the convoy. However, other evidence uncovered by the media contradicted the Marines' account, prompting the United States military to open an investigation into the incident.

On 21 December 2006, eight Marines from 3/1' were charged in connection with the incident.U.S. marine faces 13 Haditha murder charges, CBC. Accessed 21 December 2006. By 17 June 2008, six defendants had had their cases dropped and a seventh found not guilty. The exception was former Staff Sergeant, now-Private Frank Wuterich, who was convicted of a single count of negligent dereliction of duty on 24 January 2012. Wuterich received a rank reduction and pay cut but avoided jail time.

Operation Enduring Freedom
In April 2010, 3/1 deployed to Helmand Province, Afghanistan in support of Operation Enduring Freedom. The battalion conducted combat operations in the area, including activity in Koshtay and Safar in Garmsir District, and returned to Camp Pendleton in November 2010.

Medal of Honor recipients from 3/1
Marines from the 3/1 have been awarded the Medal of Honor for actions during World War II and the Korean War.

World War II
 Private First Class William Adelbert Foster – Company K – 1945
 Sergeant Elbert Luther Kinser – Company I – 1945

Korean War
 Private First Class William Bernard Baugh – Weapons Company – 1950
 Major Reginald Rodney Myers, – H&S Company – 1950
 Captain Carl Leonard Sitter – Company G – 1950
 Technical Sergeant Harold Edward Wilson – Company G – 1951

Notable former members

Smedley D. Butler, "Old Gimlet Eye", Mexican Revolution and World War I, Medal of Honor
Joseph F. Dunford, Jr., Iraq War and War in Afghanistan, Chairman of the Joint Chiefs of Staff
Walter Fillmore, Vietnam War, Bronze Star
 Zach Iscol, Iraq War, Bronze Star, candidate in the 2021 New York City Comptroller election
Bradley Kasal, Persian Gulf War and Iraq War, Navy Cross
Foster LaHue, Silver Star
Sean Stokes, Iraq War, Silver Star, killed in Iraq
Dale Burger Jr., Iraq War, Silver Star, Killed in Fallujah, Iraq

Unit awards
A unit citation or commendation is an award bestowed upon an organization for the action cited. Members of the unit who participated in said actions are allowed to wear on their uniforms the awarded unit citation. 3/1 has been presented with the following awards:

See also

Operation Phantom FuryClose Combat: First to FightSix Days in Fallujah''
Los Angeles riots of 1992
List of United States Marine Corps battalions

Notes

References

Bibliography

Web

 3/1's official website
 Marine Corps Medal of Honor recipients
 Unofficial 3/1/ Page
 

Infantry battalions of the United States Marine Corps
Military units and formations established in 1941
United States Marine Corps units and formations in the Korean War
1st Marine Division (United States)
Articles containing video clips